is a Japanese yaoi manga series written and illustrated by Yuu Moegi. Private Teacher! was serialized in the monthly manga magazine Drap from 2009 to 2012. The book was followed up with a one-volume sequel spin-off titled .

Plot

Rintaro Noe, a clumsy high school student, dreads being around his tutor, Kaede Sumizome, who teases him incessantly. However, he doesn't realize that he's attracted to Kaede and that the reason for Kaede's playfulness around him may be because he returns those feelings.

Characters

Rintaro is a clumsy and airheaded third year high school student who falls in love with Kaede. Halfway into the series, he begins attending college and living with Kaede.

Kaede is a chemistry major at a prestigious university and becomes Rintaro's tutor. He enjoys teasing Rintaro to see his reactions and is deeply fond of him.

Haruka is Kaede's cousin who is the same age as Rintaro. His friendly and cutesy behavior is an act that hides his aggressive and sadistic personality. Later, he enrolls in Kaede's college as a law student and pursues Tokiwa, who had helped him find his contact lenses when he was in high school.

Ninose is Rintaro's high school classmate.

Tokiwa is Kaede's colleague who researches at the same laboratory. He has difficulty expressing his emotions.

Media

Manga

Private Teacher! is written and illustrated by Yuu Moegi. It was serialized in the monthly magazine Drap from the July 2008 issue released on May 31, 2008 to the April 2012 issue released on February 29, 2012. The chapters were later released in 4 bound volumes by Core Magazine under the Drap Comics imprint. In January 2011, Digital Manga Publishing announced that they were distributing the book in English under the Juné imprint.

The series was originally published as a trilogy of short stories from the July 2008 issue to the September 2008 issue. Beginning with the July 2009 issue, Moegi decided to continue the series full-time. During the series' run, Fifth Avenue released a series of audio drama adaptations on CD, with each adapting a volume. The first drama CD, adapting volumes 1 and 2, was released on August 26, 2009. The second drama CD, adapting volume 3, was released on August 24, 2011. The third drama CD, adapting volume 4, was released on August 24, 2012. A special drama CD titled Sweet Horror Night, featuring chapter 8 of volume 3, was released on September 26, 2014.

On December 23, 2015, Moegi released her first artbook, Wedding Night, with artwork from the series and her other works. The artbook also included a bonus comic featuring Kaede and Rintaro.

Sequel

The series was followed up with a one-volume spin-off titled , which was a continuation of Haruka and Tokiwa's story from 2010. It was serialized in Drap from the October 2012 issue released on August 31, 2012 to the August 2013 issue released on June 29, 2013. A drama CD adaptation was released on November 13, 2015.

Dōjinshi

Under the pseudonym "Jari-kengai", Moegi has also self-published unofficial dōjinshi of the series and sold limited copies exclusively at Comiket.

Reception

Volume 3 peaked at #46 on Oricon and sold 18,327 physical copies on its first week of sales.

References

External links
 

Drama anime and manga
Japanese radio dramas
LGBT in anime and manga
Yaoi anime and manga
2000s LGBT literature
Digital Manga Publishing titles